Thomas Boxall (dates unknown) was a noted English cricketer who played during the late 18th century. He is considered to have been "one of the finest professional cricketers" of his day.

Boxall was a noted bowler and is believed to be the first player to have bowled leg breaks. Bowling underarm, he took more than 300 wickets in 89 first-class matches, playing between 1789 and 1803. As a professional he played for a wide variety of sides, most frequently appearing for England sides and for Kent county cricket teams, although he played as a given man for both Brighton and Middlesex teams. He was employed by Stephen Amherst, who organised matches featuring Kent sides, at his estate in Kent. Amherst constructed an indoor practice area in a converted barn so that Boxall could bowl during the winter.

In 1801, towards the end of his playing career, Boxall published the earliest known instructional book on cricket, Rules and Instructions for Playing at the Game of Cricket. Early editions of the book are considered to be "extremely scarce" and are prized by collectors of early cricket literature. The book, which was printed in London by E Billing and was pocket sized, has been described as "perhaps the most rare and coveted" example of early cricket literature, and "the rarest of all cricket items". A copy of the second edition of the book, thought to have been printed in 1802, sold at auction for £2,600 in 2010.

Notes

References

Year of death missing
English cricketers
Kent cricketers
English cricketers of 1787 to 1825
Surrey cricketers
Marylebone Cricket Club cricketers
Middlesex cricketers
R. Leigh's XI cricketers
Brighton cricketers
Non-international England cricketers
West Kent cricketers
Colonel C. Lennox's XI cricketers
Lord Yarmouth's XI cricketers
T. Mellish's XI cricketers